Anthony "Tony" Grano (born November 11, 1980) is an American heavyweight boxer. He was the US amateur heavyweight (201 lbs limit) champion in 2005.

Amateur highlights 

2005
 National Golden Gloves Heavyweight competition
 Defeated Arturo Reyes 5-0
 Defeated Allen Grissom RSC 2
 Defeated Erick Vega 3-2
 Lost to Eric Fields 1-4 in final, for 2nd place
 United States Amateur Heavyweight championships
 Defeated Yuwshua Zoock 27-4
 Defeated Tim Skolnik RSC 3
 Defeated Marcus Henry 14-10
 Defeated Homer Fonesca RET 4, to win championship

Professional career 

Grano, originally from Connecticut, now trains and fights out of West Palm Beach FL. Weighing 220 pounds, Italian-American Tony "TNT" Grano made his debut in 2005 and has a record of 20-2-1 with 16 knockouts.  In 2009, Grano scored a KO over previously undefeated (18-0) amateur star Travis Kauffman. The KO over Kauffman was Ringside Magazines 2009 heavyweight fight of the year. After stopping veteran Brian Minto in a NABF heavyweight title eliminator in the third round Grano KOd shopworn 43-year old former contender DaVarryl Williamson for the NABF heavyweight championship. He lost his momentum by dropping a decision to 19-2 Eric Molina in 2013 and has been idle since.

External links 
 
 Tony Grano website
 Grano upsets Minto YouTube highlight

References

1980 births
Boxers from Connecticut
Heavyweight boxers
Living people
Winners of the United States Championship for amateur boxers
Sportspeople from Hartford, Connecticut
American male boxers
American people of Italian descent